Richard Ian Morris (July 5, 1946 – August 25, 1998) was a Canadian professional ice hockey winger who played 413 games in the World Hockey Association. During his career, he played with the Chicago Cougars, Denver Spurs, Ottawa Civics, Edmonton Oilers, and Quebec Nordiques.

References

External links

1946 births
1998 deaths
Canadian ice hockey left wingers
Chicago Cougars players
Dallas Black Hawks players
Denver Spurs (WHA) players
Edmonton Oilers (WHA) players
Greensboro Generals (EHL) players
Hamilton Red Wings (OHA) players
Ice hockey people from Ontario
Ottawa Civics players
Quebec Nordiques (WHA) players
Sportspeople from Hamilton, Ontario